The lindworm (worm meaning snake), also spelled lindwyrm or lindwurm, is a mythical creature in Northern and Central European folklore living deep in the forest that traditionally has the shape of a giant serpent monster. It can be seen as a sort of dragon.

According to legend, everything that lies under the lindworm will increase as the lindworm grows, giving rise to tales of dragons that brood over treasures to become richer. Legend tells of two kinds of lindworm, a good one associated with luck, often a cursed prince who has been transformed into another beast (as in the fairy tale The Frog Prince), and a bad one, a dangerous man-eater which will attack humans on sight. A lindworm may swallow its own tail, turning itself into a rolling wheel, as a method of pursuing fleeing humans.

The head of the 16th-century lindworm statue at Lindwurm Fountain in Klagenfurt, Austria, is modeled on the skull of a woolly rhinoceros found in a nearby quarry in 1335. It has been cited as the earliest reconstruction of an extinct animal.

Etymology 
Lindworm derives from Old High German lint and orm, perhaps from the Proto-Germanic adjective *linþia- meaning "flexible", or perhaps by way of Old Danish/Old Saxon lithi, Old High German lindi, "soft, mild" (German lind, (ge)linde), Old English liðe (English lithe, "agile"). The term occurs in Middle High German as lintwurm and was adopted from German into Scandinavia as Old Swedish lindormber (modern Swedish lindorm), Danish lindorm, meaning "lind-snake". In Icelandic, the term linnormr was used to translate German sources to produce Þiðreks saga (an Old Norse chivalric saga adapted from the Continent from the late 13th c.)

Portrayals 

Lindworm-portrayals vary across countries and the stories in which they appear.

Swedish lindworm (lindorm) 
In Swedish folklore, lindworms traditionally appear as giant forest serpents without limbs, living between the rocks deep in the forest. They are said to be dark in color with a brighter underside. Along the spine it has fish like dorsal fins or horse like mane, sometimes being called a "mane snake". For defence and attack it can spit out a foul milk-like substance which can blind enemies. 

Lindworm eggs are laid under the bark of Tilia cordata trees (thereof the name) and once hatched they slither away and make a home in some pile of rocks. When fully grown they can become extremely long. To counter this during hunting they swallow their own tail to become a wheel, after which they roll at extremely high speeds to pursue prey. This has given them the nickname wheel snake.

Late belief in lindworms in Sweden 
The belief in the reality of a lindorm, a giant limbless serpent, persisted well into the 19th century in some parts. The Swedish folklorist Gunnar Olof Hyltén-Cavallius (1818–1889) collected in the mid 19th century stories of legendary creatures in Sweden and met several people in Småland, Sweden who said they had encountered giant snakes, sometimes equipped with a long mane. He gathered around 50 eyewitness reports, and in 1884 offered a cash reward for a captured specimen, dead or alive. Hyltén-Cavallius came to be ridiculed by Swedish scholars and as no one ever managed to claim the reward it resulted in a cryptozoological defeat. Rumours of the existence of lindworms in Småland soon abated.

Central European lindworm (lindwurm) 

In Central Europe the lindworm usually resembles a dragon or similar. It generally appears with a scaly serpentine body, dragon's head and two clawed forelimbs, sometimes also with wings. Some examples, such as the 16th-century lindworm statue at Lindwurm Fountain in Klagenfurt, Austria, has four limbs and two wings.

Most limbed depictions imply lindworms do not walk on their two limbs like a wyvern, but move like a mole lizard: they slither like a snake and use their arms for traction.

Lindworm offshoots (guivre, vouivre, wyvern) 

There exist several related offshoots of the winged lindworm outside Northern and Central Europe, such as the French guivre and vouivre, and to some extent the British wyvern. The French guivre and vouivre are more dragon-like than the traditional lindworms while the British wyvern is a full fletched dragon canonically.

In heraldry 
According to the 19th-century English archaeologist Charles Boutell, a lindworm in heraldry is basically "a dragon without wings". A different heraldic definition by German historian Maximilian Gritzner was "a dragon with four feet" instead of usual two, so that depictions with - comparatively smaller - wings exist as well.

In tales 

An Austrian tale from the 13th century tells of a lindworm that lived near Klagenfurt. Flooding threatened travelers along the river, and the presence of the lindworm was blamed. A duke offered a reward to anyone who could capture it and so some young men tied a bull to a chain, and when the lindworm swallowed the bull, it was hooked like a fish and killed.

The shed skin of a lindworm was believed to greatly increase a person's knowledge about nature and medicine.

A serpentine monster with the head of a "salamander" features in the legend of the Lambton Worm, a serpent caught in the River Wear and dropped in a well, which 3–4 years thence, terrorized the countryside of Durham while the nobleman who caught it was at the Crusades. Upon return, he received spiked armour and instructions to kill the serpent, but thereafter to kill the next living thing he saw. His father arranged that after the lindworm was killed, a dog would be released for that purpose; but instead of releasing the dog the nobleman's father ran to his son, and so incurred a malediction by the son's refusal to commit patricide. Bram Stoker used this legend in his short story Lair of the White Worm.

The sighting of a "whiteworm" once was thought to be an exceptional sign of good luck.

The knucker or the Tatzelwurm is a wingless biped, and often identified as a lindworm. In legends, lindworms are often very large and eat cattle and human corpses, sometimes invading churchyards and eating the dead from cemeteries.

In the 19th-century tale of "Prince Lindworm" (also "King Lindworm") from Scandinavian folklore, a "half-man half-snake" lindworm is born, as one of twins, to a queen, who, in an effort to overcome her childlessness, followed the advice of an old crone who instructed her to eat two onions. As she did not peel the first onion, the first twin was born a lindworm. The second twin is perfect in every way. When he grows up and sets off to find a bride, the lindworm insists that a bride be found for him before his younger brother can marry. Because none of the chosen maidens are pleased by him, he eats each one until a shepherd's daughter who spoke to the same crone, is brought to marry him, wearing every dress she owns. The lindworm tells her to take off her dress, but she insists that he shed a skin for each dress she removes. Eventually his human form is revealed beneath the last skin. Some versions of the story omit the lindworm's twin, and the gender of the soothsayer varies. A similar tale occurs in the 1952 novel The Voyage of the Dawn Treader by C. S. Lewis.

The tale of Prince Lindworm is part of a multiverse of tales in which a maiden is betrothed or wooed by a prince enchanted to be a snake or other serpentine creature (ATU 433B, "The Prince as Serpent"; "King Lindworm").

In a short Swiss tale, a Lindworm terrorises the area around Grabs "It was as big as a tree trunk, dark red in colour and, according to its nature, extraordinarily vicious". It was defeated by a bull that had been fed milk for seven years and had hooks attached its horns. A girl, who had committed an offense, was tasked with bringing the Bull to the Lindworm. After the beast was defeated, the enraged bull threw itself off a cliff, but the girl survived. In another tale, a cowherd falls into a cave where a Lindworm lives. Instead of eating him, the Lindwurm shares his food source, a spring of liquid gold. After seven years, they are discovered by a Venetian who hauls up the Lindworm and ties it up. The cowherd, releases the Lindworm, who kills the Venetian and then leaves. When the cowherd goes home, no-one recognises him and he no longer likes human food.

See also 
 Little Wildrose
 The Laidly Worm of Spindleston Heugh
 Tulisa, the Wood-Cutter's Daughter, Indian tale about a Serpent Prince
 Norse dragon

References

External links 
King Lindorm, translated from: Grundtvig, Sven, Gamle danske Minder i Folkemunde (Copenhagen, 1854—1861).
Gesta Danorum, Book 9 by Saxo Grammaticus.
Saint George Legends from Germany and Poland
Lindorm, an article from Nordisk Familjebok (1904–1926), a Swedish encyclopedia now in the Public Domain.
Lindormen, a ballad in Swedish published at the Mutopia project.

European dragons
Creatures in Norse mythology
German legendary creatures
Scandinavian legendary creatures
English legendary creatures
Northumbrian folklore
Scandinavian folklore
Swedish folklore
Norwegian folklore
Danish folklore
Legendary serpents
Germanic legendary creatures
ATU 400-459
Coelodonta